Equal Opportunities Commission may refer to:

 Equal Opportunities Commission (Hong Kong)
 Equal Opportunities Commission (United Kingdom)